This is an incomplete list of works by François Boucher.
Death of Meleager (c. 1727), Los Angeles County Museum of Art
Project for a Cartouche (c. 1727), Los Angeles County Museum of Art
Imaginary Landscape with the Palatine Hill from Campo Vaccino (1734), Metropolitan Museum of Art
Monument to Mignard (c. 1735), Los Angeles County Museum of Art
Venus and Mercury Instructing Cupid (1738), Los Angeles County Museum of Art
Cupid Wounding Psyche (1741), Los Angeles County Museum of Art
Les Confidences Pastorales (c. 1745), Los Angeles County Museum of Art
Jeanne-Antoinette Poisson, Marquise de Pompadour (1750), Harvard Art Museums
The Interrupted Sleep (1750), Metropolitan Museum of Art
The Toilette of Venus (1751), Metropolitan Museum of Art
Shepherd Boy Playing Bagpipes (c. 1754), Museum of Fine Arts, Boston
Landscape with a Watermill (1755), National Gallery
Venus in the Workshop of Vulcan (1757), Yale University Art Gallery
Pan and Syrinx (1759), National Gallery,
Angelica and Medoro (1763), Metropolitan Museum of Art
Jupiter, in the Guise of Diana, and Callisto (1763), Metropolitan Museum of Art
Virgin and Child with the Young Saint John the Baptist and Angels (1765), Metropolitan Museum of Art
 Halt at the Spring (1765), Museum of Fine Arts, Boston
 Return from Market (1767), Museum of Fine Arts, Boston
Shepherd's Idyll (1768), Metropolitan Museum of Art
Washerwomen (1768), Metropolitan Museum of Art

References

External links

 francoisboucher.org
 Chronological list of paintings by François Boucher

18th-century French painters
French male painters
Painters from Paris
Rococo painters
Lists of paintings
Works by François Boucher